The Roman Catholic Diocese of Gibraltar is a diocese of the Latin Church of the Roman Catholic Church in the British overseas territory of Gibraltar. The Latin name for the diocese is Dioecesis Gibraltariensis. About twenty priests and nine sisters serve in the diocese. Carmelo Zammit was installed as bishop on 24 September 2016. At just over 6 square kilometers, it is among the smallest of all Catholic dioceses in the world. 

The papal representative to Gibraltar since 2017 has been the Nuncio to Great Britain, Edward Joseph Adams.

Territory
The Diocese of Gibraltar comprises five parishes. In 2006 there were 15 priests, and 15 members of religious orders (10 female and 5 male). The Diocese covers the entire  of Gibraltar.

History
After the definite Spanish conquest of 1468, Gibraltar formed part of the diocese of Cádiz and Algeciras. It remained as such after the Habsburg conquest in 1704 (since the terms of the surrender explicitly allowed Roman Catholic worship), although the remaining Catholic population in Gibraltar was quite small. The 1713 Treaty of Utrecht did not change the status of the Catholic faith in the territory. Juan Romero de Figueroa, the Spanish priest in charge of the Parish Church of St. Mary the Crowned (who remained in the town when most of the population left the city in 1704), was the first Vicar General of the town, as appointed by the Bishop of Cádiz. However, as time passed, the British authorities prevented the Bishop of Cádiz from choosing the priests for the town, directly electing them, although the Bishop approved the appointments later. The Bishop was also prevented from making his ad limina visit to the town. Bishop Lorenzo Armegual de la Mota was the last Bishop of Cádiz to make his ad limina visit, in 1720.

The Vicariate Apostolic of Gibraltar was eventually erected in 1816, thus transferring the relationship from Cádiz to Rome. John Baptist Nosardy Zino was the first Vicar Apostolic of Gibraltar, appointed on 25 January 1816. Father Nosardy remained as Vicar until 1839, when he resigned. Since then the vicar was always a titular bishop. 

The Vicariate was elevated to the status of diocese on 19 November 1910. Henry Gregory Thompson was the first Bishop of Gibraltar, until his resignation in 1927.

See also

 Roman Catholicism in Gibraltar
 Roman Catholic Bishop of Gibraltar

References

External links
 Official site
 Catholic Diocese of Gibraltar in Catholic-Hierarchy.

Roman Catholic dioceses in Europe
Christianity in Gibraltar